The Ryukyuan diaspora are the Ryukyuan emigrants from the Ryukyu Islands, especially Okinawa Island, and their descendants that reside in a foreign country. The first recorded emigration of Ryukyuans was in the 15th century when they established an exclave in Fuzhou in Ming Dynasty (China). Later, there was a large wave of emigration to Hawaii at the start of the 20th century, followed by a wave to various Pacific islands in the 1920s and multiple migrations to the Americas throughout the 20th century. Ryukyuans became Japanese citizens when Japan annexed the Ryukyu Kingdom in 1879; therefore Ryukyuan immigrants are often labeled as part of the Japanese diaspora. Regardless, much of the Ryukyuan diaspora views themselves as a distinct group from the Japanese (Yamato).

History 
After Japan (Meiji era) legalized emigration from Okinawa Prefecture, thousands of Ryukyuans started to settle in other countries.

The first group of Okinawan emigrants arrived to Hawaii on January 8, 1900 under the leadership of Kyuzo Toyama, who is often referred to as “the father of Okinawan emigration”. Today, there are 45,000 - 50,000 Hawaiʻi residents of Ryukyuan ancestry, totaling around 3% of the state's population.

Brazil received its first migrants from Japan at the port of São Paulo on June 18, 1908. Half of these migrants were from Okinawa Prefecture, despite Okinawa having less than 2% of Japan's total population.

See also

Ryukyuan people

-A region with Ryukyuan people significant population in Bolivia.
Ainu people

References

Sources
Ethnic Studies Oral History Project and United Okinawan Association of Hawaii. Uchinanchu: A History of Okinawans in Hawaii. Honolulu: University of Hawaii Press, 1981.
Kerr, George. Okinawa: History of an Island People. Tokyo: Charles Tuttle Company, 2000.
Nakasone, Ronald. Okinawan Diaspora. Honolulu: University of Hawaii Press, 2002.
Rabson, Steve. The Okinawan Disapora in Japan: Crossing the Borders Within. Honolulu: University of Hawaii Press, 2012.
Suzuki, Taku. Embodying Belonging: Racializing Okinawan Diaspora in Bolivia and Japan. Honolulu: University of Hawaii Press, 2010.

Ryukyuan people
Asian diasporas
Diaspora by ethnic group
Emigration